Marie Ortal Malka better known as Ortal or Ortal Malka is a singer, born in Israel of Berber and Andalusian origins. She began singing when she was sixteen. In 2000 Ortal moved to Spain and joined the group Gipsy Sound. Ortal was practically unknown until she was chosen to represent France in the Eurovision Song Contest 2005 when she sang "Chacun Pense à Soi" ("Everyone Thinks of Themselves") at the contest in Kyiv, placing 23rd in a field of 24.

Discography

Albums
Bar Mitsvah 
Songs for Bar Mitsvah 
Mazeltov Jewish Songs 
Best Jewish Songs 
Jewish Hits Music
Mazeltov Jewish Tunes

Singles
"Chacun Pense à Soi" (2005)
Featured in
"Pop Like That" (KNOB feat. Ortal), from their second studio album Let Love Rule

References 

French women singers
Eurovision Song Contest entrants for France
Eurovision Song Contest entrants of 2005
Year of birth missing (living people)
Living people
French-language singers